Following is a list of dams and reservoirs in Utah.

All major dams are linked below.

Dams and reservoirs in Utah

This list is incomplete.  You can help Wikipedia by expanding it.

 Arthur V. Watkins Dam, Willard Bay, United States Bureau of Reclamation (USBR)
 Big Sand Wash Dam, Big Sand Wash Reservoir, Moon Lake Water Users
 Browne Lake Dam, Brown Lake
 Causey Dam, Causey Reservoir, USBR
 Currant Creek Dam, Currant Creek Reservoir, USBR
 Cutler Dam, Cutler Reservoir, PacifiCorp
 Deer Creek Dam and Reservoir, USBR
 East Canyon Dam, East Canyon Reservoir, USBR
 Echo Dam, Echo Reservoir, USBR
 Flaming Gorge Dam, Flaming Gorge Reservoir, USBR
 Goshen Dam, Goshen Reservoir, Goshen Irrigation Co.
 Grantsville Dam, Grantsville Reservoir
 Gunlock Dam, Gunlock Reservoir, Lower Gunlock Reservoir Corp.
 Huntington North Dam, Huntington Lake, USBR
 Hyrum Dam, Hyrum Reservoir, USBR
 Joes Valley Dam, Joes Valley Reservoir, USBR
 Jordanelle Dam, Jordanelle Reservoir, USBR
 Kolob Creek Dam, Kolob Reservoir, USBR
 Lake Mary - Phoebe Dam, Lake Mary
 Lake Powell, Glen Canyon Dam, USBR (dam in Arizona and Utah)
 Little Dell Dam, Little Dell Reservoir, United States Army Corps of Engineers
 Lost Creek Dam, Lost Creek Reservoir, USBR
 Midview Dam, Midview Reservoir, USBR
 Minersville Dam, Minersville Reservoir, Minersville Reservoir Co.
 Mona Dam, Mona Reservoir, Currant Creek Irrigation Co.
 Moon Lake Dam, Moon Lake Reservoir, USBR
 Mountain Dell Dam, Mountain Dell Reservoir, Salt Lake City Corporation
 Newton Dam, Newton Reservoir, USBR
 Otter Creek Dam, Otter Creek Reservoir, Otter Creek Reservoir Co.
 Panguitch Dam, Panguitch Lake, West Panguitch Irrigation & Reservoir Co.
 Pineview Dam, Pineview Reservoir, USBR
 Porcupine Dam, Porcupine Reservoir, privately owned
 Red Fleet Dam, Red Fleet Reservoir, USBR
 Quail Creek Dam, Quail Creek Reservoir, Washington Co. Water Conservation District
 Scofield Dam, Scofield Reservoir, USBR
 Settlement Canyon Dam, Settlement Canyon Reservoir
 Soldier Creek Dam, Strawberry Reservoir, USBR
 Starvation Dam, Starvation Reservoir, USBR
 Steinaker Dam, Steinaker Reservoir, USBR
 Stateline Dam, Stateline Reservoir, USBR
 Upper Stillwater Dam, Upper Stillwater Reservoir, USBR
 Upper Enterprise Dam, Enterprise Reservoir, Enterprise Reservoir & Canal Company
 Wanship Dam, Rockport Reservoir, USBR

References 

Utah
Dams
Dams